S&M Airlines is the second studio album by the American punk rock band NOFX. It was released on September 5, 1989, through Epitaph Records. It was also the group's first release on Epitaph. A music video was made for the title track. The album was recorded and mixed in only six days at Westbeach Recorders. Bad Religion's Greg Graffin and Brett Gurewitz (who also produced the album and is the founder of Epitaph) appear on the final track, a cover of the Fleetwood Mac song "Go Your Own Way". They also did harmonies on a few other songs. Bassist/singer, Fat Mike considers it to be the first real NOFX album. It was heavily inspired by Bad Religion and Rich Kids on LSD, and showed the band moving more towards a melodic and metallic sound.  The album sold 3,500 copies upon its release.

Track listing

 Note: Track 12 is not listed on the vinyl version of the album, but does appear on the CD and cassette versions.

Personnel
 Fat Mike – lead vocals, bass
 Eric Melvin – guitar, backing vocals
 Erik Sandin – drums
 Steve Kidwiler – guitar

Additional musicians
 Greg Graffin - backing vocals, vocals on "Go Your Own Way"
 Brett Gurewitz – backing vocals
 Steve Kidwiler – backing vocals

Production
 Brett Gurewitz – producer, engineer
 Donnell Cameron – assistant engineer, cover design
 Edward Repka – artwork
 Alison Braun – photography

References

External links

S&M Airlines at YouTube (streamed copy where licensed)

NOFX albums
1989 albums
Epitaph Records albums
Albums with cover art by Ed Repka